Meterana merope, also known as the Patē Owlet, is a species of moth in the family Noctuidae. This species is endemic to New Zealand. The larvae of this species feed on pāte.

References

Noctuinae
Moths of New Zealand
Endemic fauna of New Zealand
Moths described in 1898
Taxa named by George Hudson
Endemic moths of New Zealand